The 2019–20 Port Vale F.C. season was the club's 108th season of football in the English Football League, and third consecutive season in EFL League Two. It is the first full season under manager John Askey and new owners Carol and Kevin Shanahan. The season covers the period from 1 July 2019 through to 30 June 2020.

Askey reshaped the squad by letting 14 players go and bringing in 14 new signings, though David Amoo was the only new player in the starting eleven for the opening game of the season. They lost just one league game in six matches in August, though this was a heavy 5–2 defeat at Grimsby Town, and they also exited the EFL Cup at the first round. September saw them in indifferent form, as they picked up just one league win, though Vale did secure their place in the knockout stages of the EFL Trophy. October saw more promise, as they picked up their first away win, though were held to disappointing draws at home to struggling teams. They went on to claim five wins in six games in the month of November, including a 1–0 victory at local rivals Crewe Alexandra and wins against Milton Keynes Dons and Cheltenham Town in the FA Cup. They drew four of their six games in December, though did win a penalty shoot-out to advance in the EFL Trophy, before ending 2019 with a 2–0 win over league leaders Swindon Town.

Vale had a quiet January transfer window, with only one new arrival and no major departures. A highlight of the season came in the FA Cup third round, as a glamour tie at Premier League champions Manchester City ended in a 4–1 defeat. However a 3–0 defeat to Salford City in the EFL Trophy was a less auspicious end to the club's cup interests. They went unbeaten throughout February, picking up wins over promotion rivals Northampton Town and Colchester United, to end the month in the play-off places. On 13 March, all EFL fixtures were suspended due to the COVID-19 pandemic in the United Kingdom. On 15 May, League Two clubs voted to end the season after 37 games, causing Vale to finish one place outside the play-offs.

Overview

EFL League Two
Manager John Askey called for patience as he and new owners Carol and Kevin Shanahan tried to rebuild the club following Norman Smurthwaite's ownership. Though the budget was reduced he aimed to have a smaller and more competitive squad. His first summer signing was midfielder Scott Burgess, released from Bury despite an impressive loan spell at York City; the 21-year-old had previously played on loan at Macclesfield Town in Askey's National League title winning season. He next signed Adam Crookes, a 21-year-old defender who had been released by Nottingham Forest despite impressing whilst on loan at Vale in the second half of the 2018–19 season. He then signed 25-year-old Kieran Kennedy, "a footballing centre-half" who turned down a new deal at Wrexham in order to return to the English Football League. Big target man striker Richie Bennett then joined, having been let go by Carlisle United. The signings of 27-year-old former Blackpool striker Mark Cullen and 25-year-old former youth-team midfielder Ryan Lloyd were confirmed on 26 June. On 8 July, winger David Amoo arrived on a one-year deal after rejecting a new contract with Cambridge United; this was the first signing to meet Askey's priorities of bringing in a winger, a right-back and a backup goalkeeper. Askey also evaluated five trialists in pre-season friendlies: 19-year-old Bradford (Park Avenue) midfielder Alex Hurst, former Darlington goalkeeper Jonny Maddison, former Millwall and Reading right-back Shaun Cummings, former Yeovil Town winger Rhys Browne and former Coventry City striker Kwame Thomas. Cummings left without a contract as Askey instead again signed another of his former Macclesfield Town players, 23-year-old Callum Evans, who – like Lloyd – had been released by Macclesfield boss Sol Campbell. Bookmakers predicted a mid-table finish for the club. The club kit was reverted to Erreà manufacturers and the shirt sponsors were revealed as Synectics Solutions, the company owned by chairpersons Carol and Kevin Shanahan. The black and gold away kit was launched in tribute to the protestors who helped to oust Smurthwaite. As pre-season drew to a close the club took a week long trip to Scotland. Trialist winger Rhys Browne, yet another former Macclesfield player, became the ninth summer signing on the day of the club's final pre-season friendly. Signing number ten was the new back-up goalkeeper, 24-year-old Jonny Maddison, who had impressed on trial. A third of the five trialists was also signed, though Alex Hurst was immediately loaned back to Bradford (Park Avenue) in order to gain match experience.

Vale opened the season with a creditable 1–1 draw at Colchester United, having had a fifth-minute Tom Pope penalty cancelled out by a Luke Norris goal just before half-time. Connell Rawlinson left Vale for National League side Notts County on a free transfer on 5 August, having been transfer-listed by Askey in pre-season. The first game at Vale Park of the Shanahan era came against Northampton Town, and Amoo opened his account for the club with a header before "Cobblers" midfielder Ryan Watson levelled the score at 1–1 just before half-time; Askey said the players performed well but needed to show more belief. On 17 August, Vale travelled to Moor Lane for their first ever game against Salford City and came close to recording their first win of the season after Bennett put them ahead with nine minutes to go, only for Jake Beesley to level the game at 1–1 in the third minute of stoppage-time. Four days later Vale recorded their first ever victory over Forest Green Rovers; James Gibbons went from hero to villain within the opening six minutes as he crossed for Bennett to score only to give away the ball soon after the restart to gift Joseph Mills the equalising goal, and then Cristian Montaño crossed the ball to Amoo for the game's winning goal on 34 minutes. However they ended the week with a their first league loss of the season, a heavy 5–2 defeat at Grimsby Town that Askey described as a "reality check". Askey boosted his squad with a triple signing, bringing in 29-year-old former Notts County defender Shaun Brisley, 25-year-old former Bury striker Jordan McFarlane-Archer, and 20-year-old midfielder Jake Taylor on loan from Nottingham Forest. Vale ended the month with a dour 1–0 victory over Cambridge United, Amoo's 84th-minute cross having been bungled over the goalline by a United defender.

On 3 September, it was confirmed that the club had come with an agreement to cancel Ben Whitfield's contract, who was not in Askey's first-team plans. Five days later Vale fell to a narrow 1–0 defeat at second-placed Newport County; Jamille Matt heading home on 77 minutes after Corey Whitely found room to cross on the Vale's left on 77 minutes. On 14 September, Vale suffered three first-half injuries at home to pre-season promotion favourites Plymouth Argyle, but rallied to a 1–0 victory after Nathan Smith scored the game's only goal on 76 minutes. Another tough fixture saw them travel to league leaders Exeter City just three days later, and they managed to hold their hosts up until the 81st-minute, when Ryan Bowman netted the opening goal of a 2–0 loss. Askey experimented with two strikers at home to a strong Mansfield Town outfit, though his team were fortunate to grab a 2–2 draw after Smith scored a stoppage-time equaliser; Askey went on to bemoan the officials and the Mansfield striker Danny Rose for winning a penalty with a dive. The next trip was to National League champions Leyton Orient and had to settle for a points after sharing six goals, coming from behind to dominate the first half but then lose the lead twice in the second half.

Vale launched a controversial new commercial campaign in October, offering youngsters the chance to swap Stoke City shirts and tickets for Vale ones, which was a response to Stoke's popular 'City 7s' scheme which handed seven year olds a shirt and match tickets for a game at the Bet365 Stadium. Back on the pitch, Askey signed versatile midfielder Will Atkinson on a short-term deal following injuries to Tom Conlon and Manny Oyeleke. He replaced a suspended Gibbons at right-back at home to Morecambe (a club record 11 years and 11 months after his last game for the club) and though Vale trailed 1–0 at half-time, the visitors were down to ten men and a superb Luke Joyce strike after the break started a comeback and Vale ended up 3–1 winners after a brace from Pope. However they then fell to a disappointing 2–1 defeat at Macclesfield Town after losing an early lead; Askey had experimented with a midfield diamond against his former club, going 4–3–3 to 4–4–2. A drab 1–1 home draw with 23rd-placed Stevenage followed despite Vale taking an early lead with an excellent team goal. Three days later they won 2–1 at second-placed Bradford City, with substitute Atkinson scoring his first goal for the club to win the game three minutes into injury-time. They again failed to build on a positive result and performance though as they then grounded out a 0–0 home draw with a poor Oldham Athletic side.

Vale travelled up the A500 to face local rivals Crewe Alexandra on 2 November, who were top of the table, and managed to edge a tight game 1–0 with a strike from Taylor on 61 minutes. A fortnight later and they were one goal down at home to managerless Carlisle United within the opening minute, but then came from behind to win the game 2–1 with a late strike from substitute Cullen. However they then lost a one goal lead at Scunthorpe United to lose 2–1, with in-form David Worrall also picking up Vale's first red card of the season for scuffling with Matty Lund after the final whistle.

Vale's unbeaten home league record came to an end on 7 December, as struggling Walsall engineered a 1–0 victory with the only goal of the game coming within the first minute of the second half; Conlon was also sent off. The following week they held Crawley Town to a 0–0 draw at Broadfield Stadium. Third-place Cheltenham Town then visited Burslem and shared two goals in an exciting 1–1 draw. Vale seemed to be heading for a 2–0 Boxing Day victory away at Mansfield Town after goals from centre-backs Smith and Legge, but mistakes from full-backs Montaño and Gibbons allowed Mansfield to finish level at 2–2. League leaders Swindon Town were the visitors for the final game of the calendar year and Vale managed an impressive 2–0 victory, ending a run of six games without a win.

Vale's habit of losing points from winning positions was demonstrated again on New Year's Day as they blew a half-time lead to draw 2–2 with Macclesfield Town. Having been eliminated from two cup competitions in a week, they went to second-bottom Stevenage on 11 January and seemed to heading for a goalless draw until Conlon was fouled in the penalty box, leaving Pope to score the game's only goal from the penalty spot on 88 minutes. However three days later they lost 2–1 at Morecambe after going two goals down within the opening 12 minutes, who had been bottom of the table before Stevanage's defeat to Vale; the consolation goal was scored by Gibbons, his first goal in senior football. They returned to Vale Park to play out-of-form Leyton Orient and won 1–0 thanks for a strike from Amoo, closing the gap to the play-offs to three points. However they then fell to a 3–0 defeat at league leaders Swindon Town after losing Smith to injury on 29 minutes. Vale then beat second-placed Exeter City 3–1 at home after turning round a half-time deficit thanks to a brace from Bennett. The January transfer window was a quiet one for the "Valiants", though Askey did re-sign defender Mitch Clark on loan from Leicester City. The board of directors was also reshuffled, with Carol Shanahan named as sole chair whilst husband Kevin took an ambassadorial role.

Clark's cross was deflected into the net to give Vale a 1–0 home lead over Salford City, though they went on draw the game 1–1 after 2015 summer transfer window target Tom Elliott netted a 75th-minute equaliser. The following week saw a drab game at Northampton Town, but a Worrall goal won all three points for the Vale and lifted them out of tenth position for the first time in over two months. They made it back-to-back wins with an eventful 3–2 victory at Forest Green Rovers; Vale led by three goals with 12 minutes to go, but a straight red for Clark was followed by two goals for Rovers and a second yellow card for Pope. In the face of multiple suspensions and the difficult conditions posed by Storm Dennis, Vale cruised to a 3–0 home victory over Colchester United to take their place in the play-offs, with Conlon scoring his first of the season and Cullen bagging a brace. The following week Vale brought a large away following to Walsall, but had to settle for a point after twice losing the lead in a 2–2 draw. They picked up an identical result at home to Scunthorpe United the following week, surrendering a 2–1 lead to a 90th-minute George Miller equaliser.

Vale faced a difficult trip to play-off rivals Cheltenham on 7 March, but managed to end their hosts five match winning run with a goalless draw and had two penalty shouts turned down, including one that referee Scott Duncan initially gave only to change his mind after consulting his linesman. Bennett left the club the following week, after being sold to National League side Stockport County for an undisclosed fee. On 13 March, all EFL fixtures were suspended until at least 3 April due to the COVID-19 pandemic in the United Kingdom. Six days later, the suspension was extended until 30 April, before eventually that date too was scrubbed to an unspecified time when "it is safe to resume". To help the local area during the crisis, Carol Shanahan turned the club into a community hub, delivering food and care packages to the north of the city and working closely with the city council, schools and charities. The next month it was confirmed that the club would place the entire club staff on furlough, including players and coaches from the first-team and youth-team.

On 15 May, League Two clubs voted to end the season after 37 games, causing Vale to finish one place outside the play-offs; CEO Colin Garlick said that the club had voted for the proposal despite meaning they narrowly would miss out on the play-offs as it would help to secure the financial future of all the clubs in the division. A BBC Sport study with Professor James Reade and Dr Carl Singleton from the Economics Department at the University of Reading predicted that Vale would have finished seventh if the season had played out. Askey confirmed that eight players would be offered new contracts – Luke Joyce, David Amoo, Rhys Browne, Shaun Brisley, Cristian Montaño, Tom Conlon, Mark Cullen and Nathan Smith – whilst six players would be released: Will Atkinson, Kieran Kennedy, Callum Evans, Ryan Lloyd, Jonny Maddison and Jordan McFarlane-Archer.

Cup competitions
Vale faced a difficult tie at Milton Keynes Dons (League One) in the FA Cup first round, but secured their place into the next round with Worrall scoring the game's only goal inside 20 minutes. They were then drawn away to League Two rivals Cheltenham Town and progressed into the Third round thanks to a second half Tom Pope hat-trick after having trailed 1–0 at half-time. The club were rewarded in the third round draw with a trip to the Premier League champions, Manchester City. Pep Guardiola praised Vale's away support after the club sold out their 8,000 ticket allocation. City took the lead through Oleksandr Zinchenko on 20 minutes, before Pope levelled the scoreline with a 35th-minute header; City though went on to secure a 4–1 victory thanks to goals from Sergio Agüero, Taylor Harwood-Bellis and Phil Foden.

Vale were drawn at home to Burton Albion (League One) in the first round of the EFL Cup, and though Cullen scored his first goal for the club with a 53rd-minute penalty, Burton went on to win the game 2–1.

Vale were drawn against Shrewsbury Town (League One), Macclesfield Town (League Two) and the Newcastle United Academy in the group stages of the EFL Trophy; Askey had previously managed both Shrewsbury and Macclesfield. Vale showed their strength in depth by coming from behind to beat Shrewsbury 2–1; Kennedy, Evans and McFarlane-Archer made their debuts and it was McFarlane-Archer who claimed the winning goal on 75 minutes. They then effectively booked their place into the next round with a 3–2 victory at Macclesfield, Burgess (on his debut) and Taylor scored their first goals for the club, whilst Hurst also made his professional debut in the game; despite 283 travelling supporters making the short trip, the attendance of 757 was the fourth lowest for a competitive Port Vale fixture in recorded history. Askey made eleven changes for the visit of Newcastle United's youngsters as Vale had already qualified for the next round; Cullen scored both goals of a 2–1 victory. They were then drawn at home to League Two rivals Mansfield Town and advanced after winning 4–2 on penalties; as with the league game between the two sides earlier in the season Vale came from behind in the match to draw 2–2, though this time it was the Vale who lost a 2–1 lead in stoppage-time. In the third round they faced a trip to League Two Salford City, where they had drawn 1–1 in the league back in August; however a poor performance saw them eliminated 3–0.

Results

Pre-season

EFL League Two

League table

Results summary

Results by matchday

Matches

FA Cup

EFL Cup

EFL Trophy

Squad statistics

Appearances and goals

Top scorers

Disciplinary record

Awards

Transfers

Transfers in

Transfers out

Loans in

Loans out

References

Port Vale F.C. seasons
Port Vale